Holly Wasserfall (born 1996), professionally known as Holly Rey is a South African singer and songwriter. Born and raised in  Westville, KwaZulu-Natal, her musical career began at the age of 14, signing her first publishing deal with Sony.

Rey rose to prominence after released her "Deeper" in 2018, which won Record of the Year.

Education 
In 2019, Rey graduated at the University of KwaZulu-Natal (UKZN) in Media studies.

Career 
She grew up in musical background his uncle is a musician, he taught Rey how to play the guitar during their lessons. Rey signed a record deal with Sony and released her first album Strawberry Skies in 2010.

Her breakthrough single "Deeper" was released in May 2018. The song was produced by Mondli Ngcobo. It won Record of the Year at the 25th South African Music Awards.

On March 15, 2019, her single "You" was released. The song surpassed 3,5 million streams and was certified 3× platinum by the Recording Industry of South Africa with sales of 293 055 units.
In August 2019, Rey headlined to One Big Night in Sobekeng concert.
 
In March 2020, she signed a record deal with Soulstic Music.

In April 29, she announced the title and the release date of her EP via her Instagram account. Unconditional EP was released on April 29, 2022.

References 

South African singers
1996 births
Living people
People from eThekwini Metropolitan Municipality
University of KwaZulu-Natal alumni
South African songwriters
21st-century South African women singers